Sebastian Enterfeldt (born May 22, 1988) is a Swedish former professional ice hockey player. He played with Brynäs IF and Luleå HF in the Swedish Hockey League (SHL).

Enterfeldt made his Elitserien debut playing 3 games with Brynäs IF in the 2006–07 season. He later returned to the Elitserien four seasons later with Luleå HF during the 2010–11 Elitserien season.

In the midst of the 2016–17 season having appeared in just 6 games with Brynäs IF due to a lingering arm injury initially suffered in 2014, Enterfeldt announced his retirement from professional hockey on January 27, 2017.

References

External links

1988 births
Living people
Almtuna IS players
Brynäs IF players
Luleå HF players
Swedish ice hockey centres
People from Gävle
Sportspeople from Gävleborg County